The 2020 Campeonato Internacional de Tênis de Campinas was a professional tennis tournament played on clay courts. It was the ninth edition of the tournament which was part of the 2020 ATP Challenger Tour. It took place in Campinas, Brazil between 30 November and 6 December 2020.

Singles main-draw entrants

Seeds

 1 Rankings as of 23 November 2020.

Other entrants
The following players received wildcards into the singles main draw:
  Oscar José Gutierrez
  Matheus Pucinelli de Almeida
  João Lucas Reis da Silva

The following players received entry into the singles main draw as special exempts:
  Vitaliy Sachko
  Thiago Agustín Tirante

The following player received entry into the singles main draw as an alternate:
  Orlando Luz

The following players received entry from the qualifying draw:
  Sebastián Báez
  Carlos Gómez-Herrera
  Jelle Sels
  Camilo Ugo Carabelli

Champions

Singles

  Francisco Cerúndolo def.  Roberto Carballés Baena 6–4, 3–6, 6–3.

Doubles

  Sadio Doumbia /  Fabien Reboul def.  Luis David Martínez /  Felipe Meligeni Alves 6–7(7–9), 7–5, [10–7].

References

Campeonato Internacional de Tênis de Campinas
2020
2020 in Brazilian tennis
December 2020 sports events in Brazil
November 2020 sports events in Brazil